Mahdi Gilbert (born 1989) is a Canadian professional sleight of hand card magician. He was born without hands and feet and so had to individually create all of the techniques he employs in his illusions. He's stated, "I had to become self-sufficient from an early age; there's no magic books written for me."

Filmography

Gilbert appeared on the third season of Penn & Teller: Fool Us. He performed a version of the card trick Oil and Water, which fooled Penn Jillette and Teller, granting him a trip to Las Vegas to appear for the duo's opening act.

Gilbert appeared in the documentary Our Magic, created by R. Paul Wilson. He also contributed to the research of the book The Greatest German Living by Ricky Jay, which is about Matthias Buchinger, who was similarly born without hands or feet.

In 2018 Mahdi appeared on the BBC series The One Show.

References

External links 
 Official website
 Mahdi Gilbert performs on Penn & Teller's Fool Us
 Excerpt from the film Our Magic featuring Mahdi Gilbert

Canadian magicians
Living people
1989 births